The Shubaki family assassination on 19 November 1947 was the assassination by the Lehi, a Zionist paramilitary and terrorist organization, of five members of the Shubaki family in Mandatory Palestine, as a reaction to allegations that a member of the family had acted as an informant for the British police.

It was the first violence involving Palestinian Arabs for three months (the violence during the Jewish insurgency in Mandatory Palestine had primarily been between Jewish and British forces); two days after the attacks the New York Herald Tribune reported that both sides feared that the killings might spark retaliation by Arabs against Jews.

Buildup to the assassination

"Lehi Children" incident and the Lehi insurgency against the British 
On 11 November 1947, in the final stages of the Jewish insurgency in Mandatory Palestine, British intelligence were made aware that the Lehi was holding a firearms course for young members in Ra'anana, and surrounded the building. The British respondents shot dead five members of Lehi, with no British deaths or injuries, in what is known as the  Affair. According to eyewitness testimonies and the Lehi account, four unarmed teenage members aged 15-18 were fatally shot along with their 19-year-old instructor as they tried to run away from the house, and two teenagers aged 16-17 years were left severely wounded. This is in contrast to the account given by the British police, which maintained that the victims were shot because they were armed and the officers under "immediate danger." Police files that were released to the public later in 2021 indicated that the order to raid the house had been approved directly from the British government in London. While the police records do state that the British were under danger, it does not mention at what moment the officers started shooting. It also confirms that the victims were already running out the building before they were killed.

Lehi retaliated with terrorist attacks against the British:
 On 12 November 1947, Lehi members killed one British soldier and wounded three near Haifa
 On 13 November 1947, Lehi members attacked patrons at the Ritz coffee shop in Jerusalem, injuring 28 people
 On 15 November 1947, Lehi members killed two British policemen in Jerusalem

Planning of the assassination 
Lehi leader Nathan Yellin-Mor led an investigation into how the British knew about the meeting on 11 November. The Palestinian Arab Shubaki family lived nearby the meeting place, and Lehi concluded that they must have acted as informants. Lehi decided to kill members of the family in order to punish the family and to warn Arabs throughout Palestine not to help the British.

The assassination
At 4:30am on 19 November 1947, ten Lehi members armed with submachine guns entered the village of Arab al-Shubaki, situated between the Jewish towns of Herzeliya and Ra'anana (with whom they are thought to have had good relations).

The Lehi militants were dressed as police, and told the mukhtar (village head) to gather all the men in the village and select five of them. They took the unarmed men to a nearby field and executed them.

The victims were:
 Ahmed Salameh Shubaki (50 years old)
 Wadia Shubaki (25 years old)
 Sammy Shubaki (23 years old)
 Sami Shubaki (23 years old) (cousin)
 Sabar Ahmed Shubaki (27 years old, a cousin))

Aftermath
On 21 November, the Lehi issued a statement in which they accepted responsibility for the attack. The statement, which was written "for our Arab brothers", stressed that the shootings were not done because the victims were Arab or Muslim but because they suspected the Shubaki family to have assisted the British police. The Lehi published names of Arabs and Jews who they believed were helping the British administration, warning the listed individuals to cease all support for the British lest they become the next targets.

Arab militants retaliated approximately ten days later with the Fajja bus attacks; immediately after the bus attacks a flyer was posted on walls in Jaffa explaining that the bus attacks were revenge for the Shubaki assassinations.

References

November 1947 events in Asia
1947 murders in Asia
1947–1948 civil war in Mandatory Palestine
Mass murder in 1947
Massacres in Mandatory Palestine
1940s mass shootings in Asia
1947 in Mandatory Palestine